Kushinagar is a constituency of the Uttar Pradesh Legislative Assembly covering the city of Kushinagar in the Kushinagar district of Uttar Pradesh, India.

Kushinagar is one of five assembly constituencies in the Kushi Nagar Lok Sabha constituency. Since 2008, this assembly constituency is numbered 333 amongst 403 constituencies.

Election results

2022

2017
Bharatiya Janta Party candidate Rajnikant Mani Tripathi won in last Assembly election of 2017 Uttar Pradesh Legislative Elections defeating Bahujan Samaj Party candidate Rajesh Pratap Rao "Banti Bhaiya " by a margin of 48,103 votes.

Members of Legislative Assembly

References

External links
 

Assembly constituencies of Uttar Pradesh
Kushinagar district